Heinrich Mendelssohn (21 February 1881 – 7 August 1959) was a German contractor and real estate developer.

Early life 
Mendelssohn was born in Posen, German Empire( today Poznań, Poland) in 1881.

A claimed connection to the family of the famous Jewish philosopher Moses Mendelssohn has not yet been confirmed. He is most likely the father [illegitimately] of the British actor Daniel Gerroll, whose mother was Heinrich's paramour from 1949 to 1959.

Activity 
Mendelssohn participated in the construction and development numerous projects located in Berlin, i.e: the Hansaviertel, the Bavarian quarter, the Kurfürstendamm and the Olivaer Platz. He was also behind a development of the skyscraper at the Anhalter Station in Berlin which was named after the Saxon royal family.In cooperation with Albert Heilmann, Mendelssohn constructed the Europahaus (House of Europe) in Berlin, which today houses the German Federal Ministry for Economic Cooperation and Development. He emigrated during the Third Reich.

Death 
Mendelssohn died in Geneva, Switzerland in 1959.

References

1881 births
1959 deaths
Businesspeople from Poznań
Businesspeople in construction
German businesspeople in real estate
People from the Province of Posen
German emigrants to Switzerland